Nugola is a town in Tuscany, central Italy, administratively a frazione of the comune of Collesalvetti, province of Livorno. At the time of the 2011 census its population was 874.

Nugola is about 14 km from Livorno and 6 km from Collesalvetti.

Bibliography 
 

Frazioni of the Province of Livorno